Vladimir Petrovich Brukhti (11 June 1945 – 16 July 2004) was an Azerbaijani footballer.  Brukhti played for Neftchi Baku as a defenseman from 1963 to 1972.  He was classified as a Master of Sport of the USSR in 1966 following Neftchi's third-place finish in the Soviet Top League that year.

References

External links

1945 births
Footballers from Baku
Soviet footballers
Azerbaijani footballers
Honoured Masters of Sport of the USSR
Azerbaijani football managers
Azerbaijani expatriate football managers
Expatriate football managers in Ukraine
Azerbaijani expatriate sportspeople in Ukraine
FC Vorskla Poltava managers
FC Kryvbas Kryvyi Rih managers
FC Sirius Kryvyi Rih managers
2004 deaths
Soviet Top League players
Association football defenders
Neftçi PFK players